Ai Inden (位田 愛 Inden Ai, born 3 April 1987) is a Japanese volleyball player who plays for JT Marvelous.

Profile 
She became a volleyball player at 12 years old.
She served as captain of the team between 2009 and 2010.

Clubs 
  Mie Prefectural Tsushogyo High School
  JT Marvelous (2006–)

Awards

Team 
2006–2007 V.Premier League –  Runner-Up, with JT Marvelous.
2007 56th Kurowashiki All Japan Volleyball Championship –  Runner-Up, with JT Marvelous.
2009–2010 V.Premier League –  Runner-Up, with JT Marvelous.
2010 59th Kurowashiki All Japan Volleyball Tournament –  Runner-Up, with JT Marvelous.
2010–11 V.Premier League –  Champion, with JT Marvelous.
2011 60th Kurowashiki All Japan Volleyball Tournament –  Champion, with JT Marvelous.

National team 
  2008 – 1st AVC Women's Cup

References

External links
 JVA Biography
 JT Official Website

Japanese women's volleyball players
Living people
1987 births
People from Yokkaichi
Sportspeople from Mie Prefecture
JT Marvelous players
20th-century Japanese women
21st-century Japanese women